The Kamov Ka-137, previously designated MBVK-137, is an unmanned multipurpose helicopter designed for many roles, including reconnaissance, patrol, police and ecology, emergency, and data transmitting. Three versions of the Ka-137 were made — one ship-based, one automobile-based, and another carried by the Ka-32 helicopter. The aircraft uses a piston engine, driving a coaxial-rotor system and features a tailless, sphere-shaped fuselage with four-leg leaf-spring landing gear. Sensors and other equipment are located in a special equipment compartment.

Specifications

See also
 VRT 300

References
 Jane's Unmanned Aerial Vehicles and Targets
 Military Parade "Russia's Arms Catalog", 2002
 Arma 2 Operation Arrowhead: PMC

External links

 www.aeronautics.ru
 testpilot.ru
 www.janes.com

Kamov aircraft
1990s Soviet and Russian helicopters
Unmanned aerial vehicles of Russia
1990s Soviet and Russian military reconnaissance aircraft